In mathematics, the Littlewood–Richardson rule is a combinatorial description of the coefficients that arise when decomposing a product of two Schur functions as a linear combination of other Schur functions. These coefficients are natural numbers, which the Littlewood–Richardson rule describes as counting certain skew tableaux. They occur in many other mathematical contexts, for instance as multiplicity in the decomposition of tensor products of finite-dimensional representations of general linear groups, or in the decomposition of certain induced representations in the representation theory of the symmetric group, or in the area of algebraic combinatorics dealing with Young tableaux and symmetric polynomials.

The Littlewood–Richardson rule states that  is equal to the number of Littlewood–Richardson tableaux of skew shape  and of weight .

History 

The Littlewood–Richardson rule was first stated by  but though they claimed it as a theorem they only proved it in some fairly simple special cases. 
 claimed to complete their proof, but his argument had gaps, though it was so obscurely written that these gaps were not noticed for some time, and his argument is reproduced in the book  .
 used the  Littelmann path model to generalize the Littlewood–Richardson rule to other semisimple Lie  groups.

The Littlewood–Richardson rule is notorious for the number of errors that appeared prior to its complete, published proof. Several published attempts to prove it are incomplete, and it is particularly difficult to avoid errors when doing hand calculations with it: even the original example in  contains an error.

Littlewood–Richardson tableaux 

A Littlewood–Richardson tableau is a skew semistandard tableau with the additional property that the sequence obtained by concatenating its reversed rows is a lattice word (or lattice permutation), which means that in every initial part of the sequence any number  occurs at least as often as the number . Another equivalent (though not quite obviously so) characterization is that the tableau itself, and any tableau obtained from it by removing some number of its leftmost columns, has a weakly decreasing weight. Many other combinatorial notions have been found that turn out to be in bijection with Littlewood–Richardson tableaux, and can therefore also be used to define the Littlewood–Richardson coefficients.

Example 

Then the fact that  can be deduced from the fact that the two tableaux shown at the right are the only two Littlewood–Richardson tableaux of shape  and weight . Indeed, since the last box on the first nonempty line of the skew diagram can only contain an entry 1, the entire first line must be filled with entries 1 (this is true for any Littlewood–Richardson tableau); in the last box of the second row we can only place a 2 by column strictness and the fact that our lattice word cannot contain any larger entry before it contains a 2. For the first box of the second row we can now either use a 1 or a 2. Once that entry is chosen, the third row must contain the remaining entries to make the weight (3,2,1), in a weakly increasing order, so we have no choice left any more; in both case it turns out that we do find a Littlewood–Richardson tableau.

A more geometrical description 

The condition that the sequence of entries read from the tableau in a somewhat peculiar order form a lattice word can be replaced by a more local and geometrical condition. Since in a semistandard tableau equal entries never occur in the same column, one can number the copies of any value from right to left, which is their order of occurrence in the sequence that should be a lattice word. Call the number so associated to each entry its index, and write an entry i with index j as i[j]. In fact the entry i[j] should also occur in a column no further to the right than that same entry  (which at first sight appears to be a stricter condition). If the weight of the Littlewood–Richardson tableau is fixed beforehand, then one can form a fixed collection of indexed entries, and if these are placed in a way respecting those geometric restrictions, in addition to those of semistandard tableaux and the condition that indexed copies of the same entries should respect right-to-left ordering of the indexes, then the resulting tableaux are guaranteed to be Littlewood–Richardson tableaux.

An algorithmic form of the rule 

The Littlewood–Richardson as stated above gives a combinatorial expression for individual Littlewood–Richardson coefficients, but gives no indication of a practical method to enumerate the Littlewood–Richardson tableaux in order to find the values of these coefficients. Indeed, for given  there is no simple criterion to determine whether any Littlewood–Richardson tableaux of shape  and of weight  exist at all (although there are a number of necessary conditions, the simplest of which is ); therefore it seems inevitable that in some cases one has to go through an elaborate search, only to find that no solutions exist.

Nevertheless, the rule leads to a quite efficient procedure to determine the full decomposition of a product of Schur functions, in other words to determine all coefficients  for fixed λ and μ, but varying ν. This fixes the weight of the Littlewood–Richardson tableaux to be constructed and the "inner part" λ of their shape, but leaves the "outer part" ν free. Since the weight is known, the set of indexed entries in the geometric description is fixed. Now for successive indexed entries, all possible positions allowed by the geometric restrictions can be tried in a backtracking search. The entries can be tried in increasing order, while among equal entries they can be tried by decreasing index.

A similar method can be used to find  all coefficients  for fixed λ and ν, but varying μ.

Littlewood–Richardson coefficients

The Littlewood–Richardson coefficients c    appear in the following interrelated ways:
They are the structure constants for the product in the ring of symmetric functions with respect to the basis of Schur functions

or equivalently c   is the inner product of sν and sλsμ.
They express skew Schur functions in terms of Schur functions

The c   appear as intersection numbers on a Grassmannian:

where σμ is the class of the Schubert variety of a Grassmannian corresponding to μ.
c    is the number of times the irreducible representation Vλ ⊗ Vμ of the product of symmetric groups S|λ| × S|μ| appears in the restriction of the representation Vν of S|ν| to S|λ| × S|μ|. By Frobenius reciprocity this is also the number of times that Vν occurs in the representation of S|ν| induced from Vλ ⊗ Vμ.
The c   appear in the decomposition of the tensor product  of two Schur modules (irreducible representations of special linear groups)

c    is the number of standard Young tableaux of shape ν/μ that are jeu de taquin equivalent to some fixed standard Young tableau of shape λ.
c   is the number of Littlewood–Richardson tableaux of shape ν/λ and of weight μ.
c   is the number of pictures between μ and ν/λ.

Special cases

Pieri's formula 

Pieri's formula, which is the special case of the Littlewood–Richardson rule in the case when one of the partitions has only one part, states that 

where Sn is the Schur function of a partition with one row and the sum is over all partitions λ obtained from μ by adding n elements to its Ferrers diagram, no two in the same column.

Rectangular partitions  

If both partitions are rectangular in shape, the sum is also multiplicity free . Fix a, b, p, and q positive integers with p  q. Denote by  the partition with p parts of length a.

For example,
.

Generalizations

Reduced Kronecker coefficients of the symmetric group 

Skew Schur functions 

 extended the Littlewood–Richardson rule to skew Schur functions as follows:

where the sum is over all tableaux T on μ/ν such that for all j, the sequence of integers λ+ω(T≥j) is non-increasing, and ω is the weight.

Newell-Littlewood numbers 

Newell-Littlewood numbers are defined from Littlewood–Richardson coefficients by the cubic expression

Newell-Littlewood numbers give some of the tensor product multiplicities of finite-dimensional representations of classical Lie groups of the types .

The non-vanishing condition on Young diagram sizes  leads to 

Newell-Littlewood numbers are generalizations of Littlewood–Richardson coefficients in the sense that

Newell-Littlewood numbers are the structure constants of an associative and commutative algebra whose basis elements are partitions, with the product . For example,

Examples

The examples of Littlewood–Richardson coefficients below are given in terms of products of Schur polynomials Sπ, indexed by partitions π, using the formula 

All coefficients with ν at most 4 are given by:
S0Sπ = Sπ for any π. where S0=1 is the Schur polynomial of the empty partition
S1S1 = S2 + S11
S2S1 = S3 + S21
S11S1 = S111 + S21
S3S1 = S4 + S31
S21S1 = S31 + S22 + S211
S2S2 = S4 + S31 + S22
S2S11 = S31 + S211
S111S1 = S1111 + S211
S11S11 = S1111 + S211 + S22

Most of the coefficients for small partitions are 0 or 1, which happens in particular whenever one of the factors is of the form Sn or S11...1, because of Pieri's formula and its transposed counterpart. The simplest example with a coefficient larger than 1 happens when neither of the factors has this form:
S21S21 = S42 + S411 + S33 + 2S321 + S3111 + S222 + S2211.
For larger partitions the coefficients become more complicated. For example,
S321S321 = S642 +S6411 +S633 +2S6321 +S63111 +S6222 +S62211 +S552 +S5511 +2S543 +4S5421 +2S54111  +3S5331 +3S5322 +4S53211 +S531111 +2S52221 +S522111 +S444 +3S4431 +2S4422 +3S44211 +S441111 +3S4332 +3S43311 +4S43221 +2S432111 +S42222 +S422211 +S3333 +2S33321 +S333111 +S33222 +S332211 with 34  terms and total multiplicity 62, and the largest coefficient is 4
S4321S4321 is a sum of 206  terms with total multiplicity is 930, and the largest coefficient is 18.
S54321S54321 is a sum of 1433  terms with total multiplicity  26704, and the largest coefficient (that of S86543211) is 176.
S654321S654321 is a sum of 10873 terms with total multiplicity is 1458444 (so the average value of the coefficients is more than 100, and they can be as large as 2064).

S431S221 =  S652 + S6511  + S643 + 2S6421 + S64111 + S6331 + S6322 + S63211 + S553 + 2S5521 + S55111 + 2S5431 + 2S5422 + 3S54211  + S541111 + S5332 + S53311 + 2S53221 + S532111 + S4432 + S44311 + 2S44221 + S442111 + S43321 + S43222 + S432211
with 26 terms coming from the following 34 tableaux:

....11 ....11 ....11 ....11 ....11 ....11 ....11 ....11 ....11    
...22  ...22  ...2   ...2   ...2   ...2   ...    ...    ...
.3     .      .23    .2     .3     .      .22    .2     .2     
       3             3      2      2      3      23     2      
                                   3                    3

....1  ....1  ....1  ....1  ....1  ....1  ....1  ....1  ....1   
...12  ...12  ...12  ...12  ...2   ...1   ...1   ...2   ...1
.23    .2     .3     .      .13    .22    .2     .1     .2      
       3      2      2      2      3      23     23     2
                     3                                  3

....1  ....1  ....1  ....1  ....1  ....1  ....1  ....1   
...2   ...2   ...2   ...    ...    ...    ...    ...    
.1     .3     .      .12    .12    .1     .2     .2      
2      1      1      23     2      22     13     1
3      2      2             3      3      2      2
              3                                  3

....   ....   ....   ....   ....   ....   ....   ....   
...1   ...1   ...1   ...1   ...1   ...    ...    ...    
.12    .12    .1     .2     .2     .11    .1     .1      
23     2      22     13     1      22     12     12
       3      3      2      2      3      23     2
                            3                    3

Calculating skew Schur functions is similar. 
For example, the 15 Littlewood–Richardson tableaux for ν=5432 and λ=331 are 
...11 ...11 ...11 ...11 ...11 ...11 ...11 ...11 ...11 ...11 ...11 ...11 ...11 ...11 ...11
...2  ...2  ...2  ...2  ...2  ...2  ...2  ...2  ...2  ...2  ...2  ...2  ...2  ...2  ...2
.11   .11   .11   .12   .11   .12   .13   .13   .23   .13   .13   .12   .12   .23   .23
12    13    22    12    23    13    12    24    14    14    22    23    33    13    34
so S5432/331 = Σc  Sμ = S52 + S511 + S4111 + S2221 + 2S43 + 2S3211 + 2S322 + 2S331 + 3S421 .

Notes

References 

 Zbl0019.25102

External links 
 An online program, decomposing products of Schur functions using the Littlewood–Richardson rule

Algebraic combinatorics
Invariant theory
Representation theory
Symmetric functions